The Valley of Tears – The Ballads is a compilation album by British rock band Magnum, released on 6 January 2017. The album features 10 remastered, remixed or re-recorded ballads from the band's catalogue. The release was supported with a few shows in the United Kingdom and Ireland before the release date, and a tour in Switzerland and Germany from March 30.

Track listing

Personnel
Tony Clarkin – guitar
Bob Catley – vocals
Al Barrow – bass guitar
Mark Stanway – keyboards
Harry James – drums

Charts

References

External links
Nuclear Blast – MAGNUM: The valley of tears – The ballads

2017 compilation albums
Magnum (band) compilation albums